Dick Smith Foods was a food brand created by Australian entrepreneur Dick Smith to provide Australian owned and produced alternatives to products from foreign-owned food companies. Generally, the brand focused on producing local alternatives to products with large market shares like Kraft peanut butter and Vegemite. However, Dick Smith Foods did not manufacture its own food products; instead, it sourced products from other Australian-owned companies, which licensed the Dick Smith Foods brand label. Dick Smith Foods also donated a portion of its profits to charitable causes.

On 26 July 2018, Dick Smith announced that the business would close in 2019, blaming competition from German supermarket Aldi.

History

Dick Smith Foods was formed in 1999 largely in response to the high market share of international companies such as Kraft, and the increasingly frequent take-over of previously Australian-owned companies including Arnott's and Pauls. In particular, Smith was concerned that many companies which were no longer Australian owned still marketed their products as "Australian": the iconic Australian breakfast spread Vegemite, for example, was owned by Kraft Foods (now known as Mondelēz), which in turn was (until 2007) owned by the Altria Group (formerly known as tobacco giant Philip Morris).

In 2004, Smith announced his intention to make Dick Smith Foods a commercial operation, and to list it on the stock market by 2009. In the same year, Smith offered to purchase Vegemite from Kraft, but was unsuccessful. In 2006, the Herald Sun newspaper reported that Dick Smith Foods turnover had halved, due in part to the difficulty of finding local suppliers for their products.

In 2011, Smith announced that he would be taking control of the management of the company again, after turnover dropped from $80 million to $8 million over the previous five years. He implemented a vision for the return to Australian-owned, Australian-grown produce where all the profits stay in Australia, instead of heading offshore as they do with the majority of foreign-owned food suppliers. The company had previously been managed, and some of its products produced under licence, by the Sanitarium Health and Wellbeing Company, which paid Dick Smith Foods for the rights to the company's branding.

On 26 July 2018, Dick Smith announced that the business would close in 2019 in order to avoid bankruptcy. Smith blamed competition with German supermarket Aldi's products for the demise of the brand.

Legal issues
Dick Smith Foods ran into legal difficulties in 2003, when Arnott's Biscuits Holdings took the company to court. The issue was a trademark dispute over Dick Smith Foods' "Temptin'" brand of chocolate biscuits, which Arnott's alleged had diluted their trademark for their similar Tim Tam biscuits, in similarly designed packaging. The case was settled out of court, and Smith responded by casting Greg Arnott, a member of the Arnott family, in a commercial for Temptin's.

References

External links
Dick Smith Foods website

Food and drink companies established in 1999
Food and drink companies of Australia
Australian brands
Australian companies established in 1999